Saint-Claud is a commune in the Charente department in southwestern France.

The small commune is located northeast of Angoulême.

Population

Personalities
The commune is partly the ancestral home of Sir Wilfrid Laurier, Prime Minister of Canada from 1896 to 1911 (Laurier's ancestor was François Cottineau, who left his home named Champlaurier, located between the villages of Saint-Claud and Nieuil, for New France in 1677 as a member of the Régiment de Carignan-Salières). It was also the birthplace of the phonetician Jean-Pierre Rousselot.

See also
Communes of the Charente department

References

Communes of Charente
Charente communes articles needing translation from French Wikipedia